Nəcəfkənd (also, Nadzhafkend) is a village and municipality in the Qusar Rayon of Azerbaijan.  It has a population of 341.  The municipality consists of the villages of Nəcəfkənd and Aşağı Qələnxur.

References

External links

Populated places in Qusar District